All for You is the first extended play by South Korean boy group Sechs Kies, released on January 28, 2020, by YG Entertainment. The EP marks their first release since Another Light (2017), and as a 4-member group following Kang Sunghoon's departure in January 2019.

Background information
On November 14, 2019, it was confirmed that the comeback video was filmed and the group had yet to decide on a release date for the album. The album release date was eventually revealed on January 7, 2020. The album was title, All for You was announced on January 12, with the title track's details released two days later.

Track listing

Charts

See also
List of 2020 albums

References

Sechs Kies albums
2020 debut EPs
YG Entertainment EPs
KMP Holdings EPs
Korean-language EPs